Sagowr may refer to:
 Sagowr-e Farrih Mohammad
 Sagowr-e Hanzaleh